Southside High School is a comprehensive public high school in Fort Smith, Arkansas, United States. Southside provides secondary education for students in grades 9 through 12 and is one of two public high schools in Fort Smith, the other being Northside High School, both of which are administered by the Fort Smith School District. The school is a three-time recipient of the National Blue Ribbon Schools Award of Excellence by the U.S. Department of Education (ED).

The school was opened in 1963 and has had over 15,000 graduates. Since 1966, the school has been accredited by AdvancED, formerly North Central Association Commission on Accreditation and School Improvement. Southside was ranked 625th in Newsweek's Top 1,300 High Schools in the U.S. in 2008. In 2008, Southside was the recipient of "Best Practice School" by Arkansas Governor Mike Beebe. For the 2007-2008 school year, Southside received the Siemen's Award for Advanced Placement exam scores.  Southside was in Newsweek's Top 1,000 High Schools in America for the 2009-2010 school year.

History

Campus
The building originally consisted of 44 classrooms in total and was continually expanded beginning in 1968:
1968: 9-room wing
1973: 12-room wing
1977: 600-seat auditorium
1978: All-weather track
1981: Physical education facility
1988: New stadium
1988: 10-room wing for business and financial classes and a cafeteria addition
1997: Athletic complex (weight room, dressing room, training area, and office space)
1999: 12-classroom addition for science classes.
2000: Fine arts complex (band, orchestral, choral, drama, speech, and counseling facilities)
2008: Indoor athletic training facility
2008: A new bathroom addition underneath the stadium bleachers
2008: The remodeling of 2 of the bathrooms (1 male, 1 female)
2009: Re-constructed parking lots
2009: Landscaping including a Columbia blue sculpture
2011: Installation of artificial turf football field and overhaul of HVAC systems
2020: Classroom and administrative wing addition
2020: Expanded cafeteria and Commons area
2021: Freshman Center, 2500-seat basketball arena

Principals
Victor Stewart, 1963–1982
Wayne Haver, 1982–2018
Lisa Miller, 2018–2021
Jeff Prewitt, 2021–Present

Academics

Graduating statistics
The first graduating class was the Class of 1966 with 282 graduates. In the Class of 2004, there were 417 graduates. The Class of 2018 was the largest graduating class with 518 graduates. Southside had its 10,000th graduate in the Class of 1991, its 15,000th graduate in the Class of 2003, and its 20,000th graduate in the Class of 2014. In 1963/1964 the tenth grade was the highest class, in 1964/1965 the eleventh grade was the highest class and the class of 1965/1966 became the first graduating senior 
class.

Awards and recognition
The school flies three flags for "Excellence in Education" presented by previous presidents Ronald Reagan, George H. W. Bush, and Bill Clinton at ceremonies held in Washington, D.C.
 In 1982–1983, Southside received its first National Blue Ribbon "School of Excellence" recognition.
 In 1986–1987, the first year any previously selected school was eligible to be renominated, Southside was one of only four schools nationally to be selected to repeat as a "School of Excellence."
 In 1999–2000, Southside was recognized for the third time as a "School of Excellence".
 Siemens Award for Advanced Placement 2008
 Two students have been recognized as a state winner of a Siemens AP Scholar Award.
 Eight students have been recognized as Presidential Scholars.

Advanced Placement (AP)
Fort Smith Southside offers AP courses in:

English Language & Composition;  English Literature & Composition;  Calculus AB;  Calculus BC; Statistics; 
Spanish Language & Culture;  US Govt./Politics;  American History;  World History;  European History;  
Psychology;  Human Geography;
Chemistry;  Physics 1 (Algebra-based);  Physics 2 (Algebra-based);  Biology;  Environmental Science;
Music Theory;   Computer Science A;  Computer Science Principles;  Seminar;  Research;

Extracurricular activities

Mascot

The Southside High School mascot was originally the Rebels (de facto Johnny Reb, a personification of a Confederate soldier).  The mascot and the school's fight song "Dixie" were controversial, due to their being "perceived symbols of racism." In 2000, Principal Wayne Haver banned the display of the Confederate flag at the school and at school events. Talk of replacing Johnny Reb with a Mustang had circulated since the 1980s but no change was made until the summer of 2015.

On June 23, 2015, a Fort Smith School Board committee banned the playing of "Dixie" and voted to replace the Rebels nickname before the 2016–17 school year.

On July 27, 2015, the Fort Smith School Board voted 7–0 to change the Rebel mascot and fight song.

Southside principal Wayne Haver stated that a new fight song would be implemented immediately for use at all school-related events for the 2015–16 school year. On July 30, 2015, Haver announced that the new fight song would be "Wabash Cannonball", which he selected after he had personally listened to more than 500 fight songs.

To select a new mascot before the 2016–17 school year, Southside principal Haver headed a selection committee which included business leaders, alumni, and students. Beginning with the 2016–2017 school year, Southside's official nickname became the Mavericks.

Athletics

Football
Southside football teams have won seven state championships at the state's highest classification (1983, 1988, 1991, 1992, 1998, 2002, 2006). Four of those titles came under longtime Southside head coach Barry Lunney Sr., who left the school after the 2004 season to coach for conference rival Bentonville. Coach Jeff Williams took over the program and led Southside to their most recent title in 2006, his second year. In 2008 and in 2009, Southside made surprising runs to the state championship game, but fell short to Bentonville in 2008 and to Springdale Har-Ber in 2009.

In the early 1960s when Fort Smith High School was separated into two schools, the split was the start of one of the premier high school sports rivalries in Arkansas. Because Fort Smith is divided down the middle by Rogers Avenue and Southside sits on one side of Rogers Avenue and Northside sits on the other, the game has been called the "Battle of Rogers Avenue". This game has become a huge event locally in the city of Fort Smith and the surrounding area (usually drawing around 10,000 people to the event), even elevating to the level of shutting down some local schools and businesses on the day of the game. Southside beat Northside, for the first time, in 1978 and repeated in 1979. The 2010 game at Southside was filmed by NFL Network as part of their American Great Rivalries program and aired on national television in January 2011; the Rebels won the game 56-29.

Fort Smith Southside has several sports rivalries, including:

 Northside Grizzlies
 Bentonville Tigers
  Springdale Har-Ber Wildcats
 Greenwood Bulldogs

Volleyball 
Fort Smith Southside volleyball teams have won seven state championships (4A - 1997; 5A - 1999, 2003, 2004; 7A - 2006, 2009, 2013).

Bowling
The bowling teams of Southside High have been one of the state's most successful with state championships in 2008, 2009 (boys), and 2010 (girls).

Track and field
The Southside track teams won three consecutive 7A class state track championships (2009, 2010, 2011). The Lady Mavericks are one of the state's most successful with 10 state track championships (1981, 1982, 1983, 1985, 1990, 1991, 1992, 1993, 1994, 1995, 2007).

Educational competitions
The school has routinely done well in education/knowledge based competitions, to include:
 Quiz bowl State Champions (3A - 1996; 7A - 2007, 2010, 2013, 2014)
 National Science Bowl (NSB) – Arkansas Regional (and State) Champions (2002, 2003, 2004, 2005, 2006, 2007, 2013, 2014)
 National Science Bowl – National Event 2007 (tied-13th place)
 Knowledge Master Open State Champions (01F, 02S, 02F, 03S, 06F, 07S, 07F, 09S, 09F, 10F, 11F, 12F)

Notable alumni
 Denny Altes - Member of the Arkansas House of Representatives.
 Jim Files - Former NFL linebacker with the NY Giants.
 Jeff McKnight - Former MLB player (New York Mets, Baltimore Orioles)
 Hunter Doohan - Actor who played Tyler Galpin in Wednesday (TV series)

References

External links

1963 establishments in Arkansas
Educational institutions established in 1963
Public high schools in Arkansas
Schools in Sebastian County, Arkansas
Buildings and structures in Fort Smith, Arkansas